The Diocese of Sarno (Latin: Dioecesis Sarnensis) was a Roman Catholic diocese located in the town of Sarno in the province of Salerno in the Campania region of Italy. In 1818, it was united with the Diocese of Cava de' Tirreni to form the Diocese of Cava e Sarno.

Bishops

Diocese of Sarno
Erected: 11th Century
Latin Name: Sarnensis
Metropolitan: Archdiocese of Salerno
...
Marco de Teramo (1418–1439 Died)
... 
Agostino Tuttavilla (1496–1501 Resigned) 
Giorgio Maccafano de' Pireto (1501–1513 Died) 
Francisco de Remolins (1513–1517 Resigned) 
Ludovico Platamone (1517–1518 Appointed, Bishop of Siracusa) 
Silvio Passerini (1518–1519 Resigned) 
Guglielmo Bertrand (1519–) 
Andrea Matteo Palmieri (1529–1530 Resigned) 
Pompeo Colonna (1530–1532 Died) 
Andrea Matteo Palmieri (1532–1534 Resigned) 
Luis Gómez (bishop) (1534–1543 Died) 
Francesco Sfondrati (1543–1544 Appointed, Archbishop of Amalfi) 
Marino Ruffino (1544–1547 Appointed, Bishop of Melfi e Rapolla) 
Donato Martuccio (Maricucci) (1547–1548 Resigned) 
Guglielmo Tuttavilla (1548–1569 Died) 
Vincenzo Ercolano (Herculani), O.P. (1569–1573 Appointed, Bishop of Imola) 
Vincenzo de Siena, O.P. (1573–1578 Died) 
Paolo Fusco (1578–1583 Died) 
Girolamo Matteucci (1583–1594 Appointed, Archbishop (Personal Title) of Viterbo e Tuscania) 
Antonio d'Aquino (1595–1618 Appointed, Archbishop of Taranto) 
Stefano Solis Castelblanco, C.R. (1618–1657 Died) 
Antonio de Matteis Corano (1659–1665 Died) 
Sisto Maria Pironti, O.P. (1666–1673 Died) 
Niccolò Antonio De Tura (1673–1706 Died) 
Marco Antonio Attaffi (1706–1718 Appointed, Bishop of Squillace) 
Didaco Di Pace (1718–1737 Died) 
Francesco De Novellis (1738–1760 Died) 
Giovanni Saverio Pirelli (1760–1792 Resigned) 
Lorenzo Potenza (1792–1811 Died)

27 June 1818: United with the Diocese of Cava de' Tirreni to form the Diocese of Cava e Sarno

See also
Catholic Church in Italy

References

Former Roman Catholic dioceses in Italy
11th-century establishments in Italy
1818 disestablishments in Europe